Rafaël Rozendaal (born 1980) is a Dutch-Brazilian visual artist currently living and working in New York City. He is known as a pioneer of Internet Art.

BYOB
Rozendaal founded BYOB (Bring Your Own Beamer), an open source exhibition concept. The idea is that anyone can create an exhibition of media art with or without budget. The manual of BYOB reads: " 1) Find a space, 2) Invite many artists, 3) Ask them to bring their projector."  With this concept Rozendaal wanted to bring the internet to a real life physical space and allow viewers to "‘walk through the internet".
Since its beginning in 2010, more than 150 BYOB events were organized around the world. In 2011, BYOB was the theme of the II Internet Pavilion for the Venice Biennale

Selling websites
Rafaël Rozendaal is one of the first artists to sell websites as art objects. His websites are sold to art collectors, who then own the domain name of that given work. Both the artist and the collector sign a contract that the work has to remain publicly accessible. The name of the collector is placed in the source code and the title of the webpage. Rozendaal created the Art Website Sales Contract, which is a public document that can be used by any artist or collector to help in the selling of public website art. In 2013, Rozendaal’s www.ifnoyes.com website sold at an auction at Phillips (auctioneers) in New York for $3,500.

Collections
Stedelijk Museum Amsterdam
Towada Art Center
Whitney Museum

Publications
2019 Haiku Rafaël Rozendaal, 
2017 Everything Always Everywhere, 
2016 Haiku Rafaël Rozendaal, 
2015 Haiku Rafaël Rozendaal, 
2013 Spheres Rafaël Rozendaal, 
2011 Domain Book, 
2010 big long now book 
2003 I am very very sorry book

References

External links
Official website

1980 births
Living people
Dutch digital artists
Net.artists
Artists from Amsterdam
Dutch expatriates in the United States
Dutch contemporary artists